Doctor in the House is a British television comedy series based on a set of books and a film of the same name by Richard Gordon about the misadventures of a group of medical students. It was produced by London Weekend Television from 1969 to 1970.

Writers for the Doctor in the House episodes were Graham Chapman, John Cleese, Barry Cryer, Graeme Garden, Bill Oddie and Bernard McKenna.
The series was directed by David Askey and Maurice Murphy among others and the producer was Humphrey Barclay. The external establishing shots were of Wanstead Hospital, London (now Clock Court).

Plot 
The plot revolved around the trials of medical students at St Swithin's hospital in London.

Cast
 Barry Evans – Michael A. Upton
 Robin Nedwell – Duncan Waring
 Geoffrey Davies – Dick Stuart-Clark
 George Layton – Paul Collier
 Simon Cuff – Dave Briddock
 Yutte Stensgaard – Helga, Dave's girlfriend
 Martin Shaw – Huw Evans (series 1)
 Jonathan Lynn – Daniel Hooley (series 2)
 Ernest Clark – Professor Geoffrey Loftus
 Ralph Michael – The Dean
 Joan Benham – Mrs Loftus
 Peter Bathurst – Dr Upton, Michael's father

Well-known actors David Jason (Only Fools and Horses), and James Beck (Dad's Army), both appeared in the 1970 Series 2 episode: "What Seems to be the Trouble?".

Episodes

Series 1 (1969)

Series 2 (1970)

References

External links
Doctor in the House at British TV Comedy Guide

1969 British television series debuts
1970 British television series endings
1960s British sitcoms
1970s British sitcoms
1960s British medical television series
1970s British medical television series
Doctor in the House
English-language television shows
First-run syndicated television programs in the United States
ITV sitcoms
London Weekend Television shows
Live action television shows based on films
Television series by ITV Studios
Television shows set in London
Television series based on adaptations
Television shows based on British novels